Carter Bancks (born August 9, 1989) is a former Canadian former professional ice hockey player. An undrafted player, Bancks played four seasons of junior in the Western Hockey League (WHL) and four more in the American Hockey League (AHL) before making his NHL debut in 2013 with the Calgary Flames. He later played the majority of his professional career with and served as captain of the Utica Comets of the American Hockey League (AHL). Bancks was born in Calgary, Alberta, but grew up in Kimberley, British Columbia.

Playing career
As a junior, Bancks played with the Junior B Kimberley Dynamiters of the Kootenay International Junior Hockey League in 2005–06 before earning a late season appearance with the Lethbridge Hurricanes of the Western Hockey League (WHL). He played four full seasons with the Hurricanes between 2006 and 2010, scoring 58 goals and 120 assists in 262 games.

Bancks went unselected at the NHL draft, and upon graduating from junior, was signed to an American Hockey League (AHL) contract with the Abbotsford Heat. He played his first full season of professional hockey in 2010–11 and while a concussion limited him to 29 games, Bancks still scored 19 points. He made a positive impression with his team; head coach Jim Playfair argued that if Bancks had been healthy throughout the season, Abbotsford would not have missed the AHL playoffs. His performance was enough for the Calgary Flames, the parent club of the Heat, to sign him to an NHL contract. He remained with the Heat for the following two seasons, scoring 10 points in 55 games in 2011–12, and 12 in 59 games the following year.

Upon the conclusion of the 2012–13 AHL season, Bancks was one of several players recalled by Calgary. He made his NHL debut on April 23, 2013, against the Nashville Predators.

As an unsigned free agent from the Flames heading into the 2014–15 season, Bancks accepted an invite to the Vancouver Canucks training camp. He was later reassigned to AHL affiliate, the Utica Comets, on September 27, 2014.

On October 14, 2016, the day before the start of this third full season with the team, Bancks was named captain of the Utica Comets.

After six seasons with the Utica Comets, prior to the 2020–21 season, Bancks announced his retirement from a 10-year professional hockey career on January 11, 2020, at the age of 31.

Personal life
Bancks' father, Jerry, was the head coach of the Kimberley Dynamiters of the KIJHL.

Career statistics

References

External links

1989 births
Living people
Abbotsford Heat players
Calgary Flames players
Canadian expatriate ice hockey players in the United States
Canadian ice hockey left wingers
Ice hockey people from British Columbia
Lethbridge Hurricanes players
Ice hockey people from Calgary
Undrafted National Hockey League players
Utica Comets players